Tassadia is a genus of plants in the family Apocynaceae, first described as a genus in 1844. It is native primarily to South America, with one species extending north into Central America, S Mexico, and Trinidad.

Species

formerly included
moved to other genera (Orthosia, Stenomeria)
 Tassadia hutchisoniana, syn of  Stenomeria decalepis
 Tassadia rhombifolia, syn of  Stenomeria decalepis
 Tassadia subulata, syn of Orthosia scoparia

References

Asclepiadoideae
Apocynaceae genera
Taxa named by Joseph Decaisne